The Eastern Aegean bleak (Alburnus demiri) is a species of ray-finned fish in the genus Alburnus. It is known from the river drainages of the Gümüldür River, the Büyük Menderes River and the Dalaman River in Turkey. It may have been found in the Küçükmenderes River before the river dried up. It is threatened by pollution, water abstraction and river damming.

References

demiri
Fish described in 2008
Taxa named by Müfit Özuluǧ
Taxa named by Jörg Freyhof
Endemic fauna of Turkey
Vulnerable animals